Asphalia is a monotypic moth genus in the family Drepanidae first described by Jacob Hübner in 1821. Its only species, Asphalia ruficollis, was described by Michael Denis and Ignaz Schiffermüller in 1775. It is found in France, Italy, Austria, Switzerland, Slovakia, Serbia, Bosnia and Herzegovina, Slovenia, Croatia, Hungary, Bulgaria, Romania, North Macedonia, Greece and Asia Minor.

Adults are on wing from February to April in one generation per year.

The larvae feed on oaks (Quercus species). Larvae can be found from April to the beginning of June. The species overwinters in the pupal stage.

References

External links

Lepiforum.de

Moths described in 1775
Thyatirinae
Moths of Europe
Moths of Asia
Taxa named by Michael Denis
Taxa named by Ignaz Schiffermüller